The United States Board on Books for Young People (USBBY) is a national section of the International Board on Books for Young People (IBBY) committed to bringing books and children together.

History
The United States National Section of the International Board on Books for Young People, USBBY, was established in the early 1960s by the American Library Association (ALA) and the Children's Book Council (CBC). It was incorporated as “Friends of IBBY” in 1979 and was headquartered at the Children's Book Council in New York City at that time. The name was changed soon thereafter, and USBBY was hosted by theInternational Reading Association (IRA), now the  International Literacy Association (ILA) in Newark, Delaware from 1985 until the end of 2008.  From 2009 the USBBY Secretariat has been located at the Center for Teaching through Children's Books in Skokie, Illinois.
 
USBBY is chartered as a non-profit corporation serving to promote and develop excellence in books for children and young people. The structure of USBBY consists of a board of directors, with a president, president-elect, past president, treasurer, secretary, and 12 directors, plus the executive director. Members include librarians, teachers, university professors, authors, illustrators, publishers, and students. Membership categories range from individual, to organizational, and patron membership (currently the American Library Association, Children's Book Council, International Literacy Association, (then the International Reading Association) and National Council of Teachers of English).
 
USBBY's regular activities include: a biannual USBBY Newsletter, a biennial regional conference, and sessions at ALA, IRA, and NCTE annual conferences and the American Library Association Midwinter Meeting. USBBY committees recommend US nominees for the Hans Christian Andersen Award, the IBBY-Asahi Reading Promotion Award, and Outstanding Books for Young People with Disabilities, as well as for USBBY's own Bridge to Understanding Award that is presented annually.

Organization

USBBY is governed by a board of directors that includes four elected and eight appointed board members who represent the USBBY membership as well as USBBY's patron organizations—the Children's Book Council, the American Library Association, the International Reading Association, and the National Council of Teachers of English. USBBY is managed by its board of directors, the USBBY general secretary, and a variety of member committees. The executive director (who is an ex officio non-voting member of the board) is the administrative officer of the organization.
 
The USBBY board of directors meets three times annually. The organization also convenes an annual meeting for its members, which is held either at the National Council of Teachers of English (NCTE) Annual Convention, or at the biennial IBBY Regional Conference. Specifics on the board's activities is available via the USBBY Manual online.

Past presidents of USBBY 
 Diane Monson 1989
 Margaret McElderry 1990
 Amy Kellman 1991
 Dorothy Briley 1992
 Mary Lou White 1993
 Barbara Barstow 1994
 Shirley Haley-James 1995
 Helen Mullen 1996
 Joan Glazer 1997
 Rudine Sims Bishop 1998
 Carl Tomlinson 1999
 Betsy Hearne 2000
 Junko Yokota 2001
 Kathleen T. Horning 2002
 Judy O'Malley 2003
 Kent Brown 2004
 Susan Stan 2005
 Sylvia Vardell 2006
 Joan Atkinson 2007
 Linda M. Pavonetti 2008
 John Mason 2009
 Kathy Short 2010
 Barbara Lehman 2011
 Doris Gebel 2012
 Kathy East 2013
 Janelle Mathis 2014
 Therese Bigelow 2016 
 Terrell Young 2018
 Evie Freeman 2020
 Tucker Stone 2022

Awards and events

Outstanding International Books List 

The Outstanding International Books (OIB) list was first started by USBBY in 2006 . The OIB list is intended to introduce American children to exceptional artists and writers from other countries, recognizing that books connect people who live in different places, during different times, or with different interests. All of the titles originated or were first published in a country other than the United States and were subsequently published or distributed in the U.S. These books not only represent the best in children's literature from around the globe, but also introduce American readers to other perspectives. The list is showcased each year in the February issue of School Library Journal.  The goal is to create more awareness of, and demand for, books from other countries, so that US publishers will be encouraged to offer more books from diverse countries to young readers in America  Their originality and appeal, and the quality of the presentations support most library collections of children's literature.

Past OIB Lists

 2022 Barger, Bettie Parsons. (2022, February 22). Fostering Curiosity  School Library Journal.

 2021 Anderson, Anamaria López. (2021, February 15). A Global Community of Readers  School Library Journal.

 2020 Gall, Patrick. (2020, February 26). Far Away, So Close  School Library Journal.

 2019 Fleischman, Bindy. (2019, February 11). Presenting the 2020 Outstanding International Books List   School Library Journal.

 2018 Walke, Martha M. (2018, February 9). Presenting 38 must-have titles: USBBY's 2018 Outstanding International Books List School Library Journal.

 2017 Johnson, Holly. (2017, January 30). Outstanding International Books: Presenting the 2017 USBBY Selections School Library Journal.

2016 Hong, Terry. (2016, February). "Welcome disruptions." School Library Journal. 34-27.

2015 Dales, Brenda. (2015, February 4). "USBBY Presents Its Annual Outstanding International Books List." School Library Journal.

2014 Dales, Brenda. (2014, February 24). "Passport to a World of Reading: USBBY's 2014 Outstanding International Books List Introduces Readers to the Global Community." School Library Journal.

2013 Salvadore, Maria. (2013, February 5). "The Literary Equation: USBBY's Outstanding International Books connect kids worldwide." School Library Journal. 34-37.

2012 East, Kathy. (2012, February 1). "All Together Now: USBBY's Outstanding International Books connect kids worldwide." School Library Journal. 44-47.

2011 Poe, Elizabeth. (2011, February 1). "Here, There, and Everywhere: The United States Board on Books for Young People cites 40 international books for its 2011 honor list." School Library Journal. 42-46.

2010 Poe, Elizabeth. (2010, February 1). "Crisscrossing the Globe: A World of International Books for Young People." School Library Journal. 42-45.

2009 Angus, Carolyn. (2009, February 1). "World Class: The Latest Outstanding International Books List Offers Tales that Speak to Every Student." School Library Journal. 36-39.

2008 Angus, Carolyn. (2008, February 1). "A World of Stories: 2008 Outstanding International Books." School Library Journal. 44-47.

2007 Isaacs, Kathleen. (2007, February 1). "Book Your Trip Now: The Outstanding International Booklist Is Just the Ticket to Take Readers to Some Faraway Places." School Library Journal. 44-48.

2006 Isaacs, Kathleen. (2006, February 1). "It's a Big World After All: Books Are the Best Way to Open Kids´ Minds." School Library Journal. 40-44.

The Bridge to Understanding Award 

The Bridge to Understanding Award formally acknowledges the work of adults who create programs that use children's books to explore cultures around the world in order to promote international understanding among children. Winning programs are based on a broad understanding of culture as ways of living and being in the world, and go beyond the surface features of a culture, such as food, fashion, folklore, famous people, and festivals.

This award was established in memory of Arlene Pillar, an educator who served USBBY as newsletter editor from 1984 until her death in 1990. Organizations eligible for the award include schools, libraries, scout troops, clubs, and bookstores. The program may be a one-time event, or an ongoing series of events, that serves children ranging in age from kindergarten through tenth grade. The award carries a monetary prize of $1000 and a certificate.

USBBY Special Projects Fund 
In February 2007, the USBBY Board of Directors approved creating a Special Projects Fund to be used specifically to fund worthy projects, both domestic (U.S.) and foreign (IBBY related projects) that merit USBBY support. Applications are judged on urgency of the need, the quality of the proposed project, short term and long term benefits, and compatibility with IBBY and USBBY's mission and goals. No more than $4,000 will be awarded annually to any one project. The deadline for application submission is August 1 each year.

International Children's Book Day 
In 2013, USBBY sponsored the poster design for IBBY's International Children's Book Day (ICBD). Illustrator Ashley Bryan and poet Pat Mora created the poster. 

In 2021, USBBY will again sponsor the poster design for the international event, this time featuring the poetry of Margarita Engle and the art of Hans Christian Andersen Medalist Roger Mello. 
The USBBY Secretariat maintains a blog with library programming ideas related to ICDL.

Biennial Regional IBBY Conference 
The biennial IBBY regional conference takes place in the fall of each off-numbered year. Organizing and hosting the conference is an opportunity to assume a leadership role in the field of children's literature and make connections with authors, illustrators and colleagues in support of USBBY's mission to promote international understanding through children's books.

Recent IBBY Regional Conference Locations 
 1995 Callaway Gardens, Georgia
 1997 Albuquerque, New Mexico
 1999 Madison, Wisconsin
 2001 Burlingame, California
 2003 Chautauqua, New York
 2005 Callaway Gardens, Georgia
 2007 Tucson, Arizona
 2009 St. Charles, Illinois
 2011 Fresno, California
 2013 St. Louis, Missouri
 2015 New York, New York
 2017 Seattle, Washington
 2019 Austin, Texas
 2022 Nashville, Tennessee
 2023 New York, New York

Publications

Bridges 
USBBY publishes Bridges, a semi-annual newsletter for its members that reports on conferences and co-sponsored sessions, as well as general news related to international literature for children and young adults. The editor considers email announcements, manuscripts, and press releases related to national and international children's literature. Deadline for submissions are Aug. 15 for the fall issue and Feb. 15 for the spring issue.

Bridges to Understanding Book Series 
Bridges to Understanding is a series of annotated bibliographies of outstanding international literature for young people. The individual volumes are published by Scarecrow Press, a division of Rowman & Littlefield and include:
Children's Books from Other Countries (1998) edited by Carl M. Tomlinson;
The World Through Children's Books (2002) edited by Susan Stan;
Crossing Boundaries with Children's Books (2006) edited by Doris J. Gebel;
Envisioning the World through Children's Books (2011) edited by Linda Pavonetti; and 
Reading the world's stories : an annotated bibliography of international youth literature(2016)  edited by Annette Y Goldsmith, Theo Heras, and Susan Corapi

References

Children's literature organizations
Organizations established in the 1960s
1960s establishments in the United States
International Board on Books for Young People